Bersani is an Italian surname. Notable people with the surname include:

Gianfranco Bersani (1919–1965), Italian basketball player
Giovanni Bersani (1914–2014), Italian politician
Giuseppina Bersani (1949–2023), Italian fencer
Leo Bersani (1931–2022), American literary theorist and Professor Emeritus
Leonard F. Bersani (1932–2000), American politician
Leopoldo Bersani (1848–1903), Italian painter and sculptor
Pier Luigi Bersani (born 1951), Italian politician
Samuele Bersani (born 1970), Italian singer-songwriter

Italian-language surnames